Zizhou may refer to:

People
Gongbo Liao ( 5th century BC), courtesy name Zizhou (子周), a disciple of Confucius

Modern locations
Zizhou County (子洲县) in Shaanxi, China

Historical locations
Zi Prefecture (Sichuan) (資州), a prefecture between the 6th and 20th centuries in modern Sichuan, China
Zi Prefecture (Shandong) (淄州), a prefecture between the 6th and 13th centuries in modern Shandong, China